Nivkh or Amuric or Gilyak may refer to:

 Nivkh people (Nivkhs) or Gilyak people (Gilyaks)
 Nivkh language or Gilyak language
 Gilyak class gunboat, such as the second Russian gunboat Korietz

See also
 Gilak (disambiguation)

Language and nationality disambiguation pages